Marvin Marvin is an American comedy science fiction television series that aired on Nickelodeon from November 24, 2012 to April 27, 2013. The series stars Lucas Cruikshank of Fred fame as the titular character Marvin Forman, an alien teenage boy adjusting to human life. The show ended with only one season after Cruikshank announced his departure from Nickelodeon on Twitter on June 26, 2013.

Premise
Set in Portland, Oregon, Marvin Marvin follows the adventures of a teenage alien with special powers named Marvin (Lucas Cruikshank) who was sent to Earth by his parents in order to protect him from evil invaders on his home planet, Klooton. Under the supervision of his new human parents, Bob (Pat Finn) and Liz (Mim Drew), Marvin tries to adjust to life on Earth as a typical American teenager. Helping him navigate Earth's unfamiliar social customs are Marvin's human siblings Teri (Victory Van Tuyl) and Henry (Jacob Bertrand) and his mischievous grandfather, Pop-Pop (Casey Sander). As if teaching Marvin how to act human was not hard enough, the family and even Teri's curious best friend, Briana (Camille Spirlin), must also conceal his real identity from the world.

Cast

Main
Lucas Cruikshank as Marvin Forman, a "teenage" alien from the planet Klooton who is revealed to actually be 580 years old in "Pilot" and hides his true alien form behind his human form. His powers include the ability to freeze and heat objects at will using his fingers. He is also able to talk to animals, shapeshift, float, and calm people down using the "Klootonian Calm Palm". In the pilot, he adopts the name Marvin Marvin because he knew Teri did not want him to have the same last name as her. He nervously repeated his first name Marvin as his last name.
Victory Van Tuyl as Teri Forman, the older sister of Henry and the younger human sister of Marvin.
Jacob Bertrand as Henry Forman, Teri and Marvin's younger brother; he turns 10 in the episode "Burger on a Bun". He is very mischievous and cunning with plans of secret parties, playing hooky, going to a nude beach on a family vacation, etc.
Pat Finn as Robert "Bob" Forman, the family's father and human "father" of Marvin.
Mim Drew as Elizabeth "Liz" Forman, the family's mother and human "mother" of Marvin. She treats Marvin like her own children and really cares for him.
Casey Sander as George "Pop-Pop", Teri and Henry's grandfather, Marvin's human "grandfather," and the father of Liz. He is very childish and mischievous like his grandson Henry.
Camille Spirlin as Brianna, Teri's very loyal best friend. She finds out about Marvin's secret in "Space-Cation".

Recurring
Angel Amaral as Ben, Marvin's human best friend. He is stereotypically nerdy and is not very popular. He quickly makes friends with Marvin when he sees that Marvin is not making friends easily. Ben is also known to have a huge comic book collection.
Dennis Atlas as Derek Winfeld, a school kid who believes he is a horse. He grows his hair long and wears brown as he gallops through the school whinnying.

Episodes

Accolades

Broadcast
The series originally aired on Nickelodeon in the United States on November 24, 2012, and on YTV in Canada on March 19, 2013.

Reception
Marvin Marvin received mostly negative reviews. Common Sense Media gave the show 2 out of 5 stars stating, "... The show's best feature is the care it takes to reminding viewers that it's important to be yourself, even when that makes you different from your peers. From a kid's point, however, this message is lost amid Marvin's outrageous predicaments." Media Life Magazine stated, "Marvin Marvin is simply bland, bland," while Brian Lowry of Variety called the sitcom a "teeth-gnashing affair" and its gags "stale".

The series premiere scored 2.6 million viewers after a brand new Victorious. The next episode that premiered had 2.1 million viewers. The most watched episodes are "Ice Pop Pop" and "Burger on a Bun" with 2.9 million viewers, and the least watched episode is "St. Glar Kai Day" with 1.7 million viewers.

See also 
Fred Figglehorn

References

External links
 

2010s American comic science fiction television series
2010s Nickelodeon original programming
2012 American television series debuts
2013 American television series endings
English-language television shows
Television series about alien visitations
Television series about families
Television series about teenagers
Television shows set in Portland, Oregon